al-Amthal (Arabic: أَمْثَال) or singular mathal (Arabic: مَثَل) is actually a literary term used to describe Arabic proverbs. Ancient Arab scholars wrote books called "Kitab al-Amthal" and compiled these proverbs. For this reason, it is observed that the term amthsal, which is originally a plural word, is used as a term.

Turkish Proverbs in Arabic Dialects 
It is thought that some proverbs in Arabic dialects are borrowed from Turkish. E.g.; The Turkish proverb "Ayağını yorganına göre uzat" [Stretch your feet according to your quilt] may have passed into Arabic dialects as "على قد لحافك مد رجليك" [Stretch your feet according to your quilt] . As a matter of fact, the aforementioned proverb is used in Old Turkish: "Yogurkanda artuk aḍak kösülse üşiyür." [The foot stretched out of the quilt gets cold.] Likewise, the same proverb can be found in Turkic languages such as Kazakh and Asian languages such as Mongolian.

References

Arabic literature
Proverbs
Proverbs by language